Mee Sindhutai Sapkal (trans.  I Am Sindhutai Sapkal) is an Indian Marathi film. The film was directed by Ananth Narayan Mahadevan. The film stars Tejaswini Pandit, Jyoti Chandekar, Upendra Limaye, and Neena Kulkarni in leading roles.

Plot
The film is a biographical account of Sindhutai Sapkal, a woman who became a social activist after a traumatic life. Born in a poor, cattle grazing family in Wardha as Chindi (Ragamuffin), Sindhutai was first married off at the age of 10 to a man who was 20 years elder to her and then abandoned by her husband on charges of infidelity.

Traveling through the backwaters of Maharashtra, the Braveheart never abandoned hope and courage and ended up in San Jose on a fund-raising mission for her orphanage which still provides shelter to homeless kids.

Cast
 Tejaswini Pandit As Sindhu 23-40 Years
 Jyoti Chandekar As Sindhutai 60 Years
 Upendra Limaye  As Shrihari Sapkal
 Neena Kulkarni As Bai

Awards
Winner: 
National Film Award – Special Jury Award - Bindiya and Sachin Khanolkar, Anant Mahadevan
National Film Award for Best Male Playback Singer - Suresh Wadkar
National Film Award for Best Screenplay (Best Adapted Screenplay) - Anant Mahadevan, Sanjay Pawar
National Film Award for Best Screenplay (Best Dialogues) - Sanjay Pawar

References

External links
 

2010 films
Films whose writer won the Best Adapted Screenplay National Film Award
Films whose writer won the Best Dialogue National Film Award
Special Jury Award (feature film) National Film Award winners
Films directed by Anant Mahadevan
2010s Marathi-language films